Chak Mitha (چک مٹھا) is a village of Phalia Tehsil, Mandi Bahauddin District, Punjab Province, Pakistan.

Notable people include the Nawab Family who now reside in Canada. 

Villages in Phalia Tehsil
Villages in Mandi Bahauddin District